Irving Rubirosa Serrano (born 3 May 1979) is a Mexican former professional football player and coach.

Career
Born in Chimalhuacán, Rubirosa made his Mexican Primera División debut with Atlante F.C. in 1999. He was involved in a player exchange with Chiapas for Fernando Martel in January 2004. He joined Monarcas Morelia in the summer of 2004, and moved to Deportivo Toluca F.C. one year later. Rubirosa returned to Jaguares in the summer of 2006. He joined C.F. Monterrey in 2007, but did not play again in the Primera.

After 10 seasons of senior football, the experienced midfielder joined Primera A side Indios de Ciudad Juárez in January 2008.

Rubirosa made five substitute's appearances for the Mexico national football team in friendlies while Ricardo La Volpe was manager in 2003.

Honours

Manager
Oaxaca
Ascenso MX: Apertura 2017

References

External links
 
 
 
 

1979 births
Living people
Mexico international footballers
Footballers from the State of Mexico
Atlante F.C. footballers
Chiapas F.C. footballers
Atlético Morelia players
Deportivo Toluca F.C. players
Club León footballers
C.F. Monterrey players
Indios de Ciudad Juárez footballers
Association football midfielders
Mexican footballers